Google Safe Browsing is a service from Google that warns users when they attempt to navigate to a dangerous website or download dangerous files. Safe Browsing also notifies webmasters when their websites are compromised by malicious actors and helps them diagnose and resolve the problem. This protection works across Google products and is claimed to “power safer browsing experiences across the Internet”. It lists URLs for web resources that contain malware or phishing content. Browsers like Google Chrome, Safari, Firefox, Vivaldi, Brave and GNOME Web use these lists from Google Safe Browsing to check pages against potential threats. Google also provides a public API for the service.

Google provides information to Internet service providers, by sending email alerts to autonomous system operators regarding threats hosted on their networks.

As of September 2017, over 3 billion Internet devices are protected by the service. Alternatives are offered by both Tencent and Yandex.

Clients protected 
 Web browsers: Google Chrome, Safari, Firefox,  Vivaldi, Brave and GNOME Web.
 Android: Google Play Protect, Verify Apps API 
 Google Messages 
 Google Search
 Google AdSense
 Gmail
 Instagram

Privacy 

Google maintains the Safe Browsing Lookup API, which has a privacy drawback: "The URLs to be looked up are not hashed so the server knows which URLs the API users have looked up". The Safe Browsing Update API, on the other hand, compares 32-bit hash prefixes of the URL to preserve privacy. The Chrome, Firefox and Safari browsers use the latter.

Safe Browsing also stores a mandatory preferences cookie on the computer.

Google Safe Browsing "conducts client-side checks. If a website looks suspicious, it sends a subset of likely phishing and social engineering terms found on the page to Google to obtain additional information available from Google's servers on whether the website should be considered malicious". Logs, which include an IP address and one or more cookies, are kept for two weeks and are tied to the other Safe Browsing requests made from the same device.

In most applications, excluding Apple's Safari in which Apple uses a proxy system, the API is installed in a way that allows Google to continuously get the actual IP address of the user. This enables Google to track users as they navigate the internet, send emails to Gmail accounts, or use Google services.

Criticism 
Websites not containing malware have been blacklisted by Google Safe Browsing due to the presence of infected ads. Requesting removal from the blacklist requires the webmaster to create a Google Webmaster's Tool account and wait several days for the removal from the blacklist. There have also been concerns that Google Safe Browsing could be used for censorship in the future, however this has not yet happened.

See also 
 Anti-phishing software
 Censorship
 Microsoft SmartScreen
 Response policy zone
 StopBadware

References

External links 
  Safe Browsing Homepage
  Transparency Report: Safe Browsing

Safe Browsing
Computer network security